Rafael Costa Silva Sandes or simply Rafael Sandes (born August 5, 1987 in Itabuna), is a Brazilian goalkeeper. He currently plays for Corinthians.

Honours
São Paulo State A2 Championship: 2005

Contract
5 January 2007 to 31 January 2008

External links
 CBF
 Copa FPF: Timão empata na reestréia de Vampeta

1987 births
Living people
Brazilian footballers
Esporte Clube Vitória players
Clube Atlético Juventus players
Sport Club Corinthians Paulista players
Association football goalkeepers